Scotura nervosa is a moth of the family Notodontidae. It is found in Venezuela, Colombia, Ecuador, Bolivia and Brazil.

References

Moths described in 1896
Notodontidae of South America